The 1949 Constitution of Costa Rica established two vice-presidencies of Costa Rica, which are directly elected through a popular vote on a ticket with the president for a period of four years, with no immediate re-election. There has been various incarnations of the office. Vice presidents replace the president in cases of temporary or permanent absence.

Throughout the history of independent Costa Rica, there have been different systems to cover the temporary or permanent absence of a president. Several different names have been used for this position:
From 1821 to 1824, the Governing Committee (Junta) selected a vice-president.
From 1824 to 1841 there was a Vice-Head-of-State who was popularly elected.
From 1841 to 1842 there was a Second-Head-of-State, elected for life by popular vote.
From 1842 to 1844 there was a Vice-Head-of-State selected by the Constitutional Assembly.
From 1846 to 1847 there was a popularly elected Vice-Head-of-State.
From 1847 to 1848 there was a Vice-President of the State, elected by popular vote.
From 1848 to 1859 there was a Vice-President of the Republic, selected through popular election.
From 1859 to 1949 there was a system of Designates to the Presidency, usually selected by the Legislature.
Since 1949 there have been two popularly elected vice presidents.

The following tables contain a list of the officials elected to the vice-presidential position since 1821.

Vice Presidents of the Governing Committees of Costa Rica (1821–1824) 
Between 1821 and 1824 Costa Rica was governed through a system of Governing Committees who chose from among their members a president and a vice-president.

Vice-Heads-of-State of Costa Rica (1824–1841)
Between 1824 and 1841, in accordance with the Basic Law of 21 January 1825 and 1844, a Vice-Head-of-State was elected by the people.

Second Heads of State (1841–1842) 

In line with the Decree of Rules and Guarantees of 1841, a popularly elected Second-Head-of-State was created to replace the Head of State in case of temporary or permanent absence.

Vice-Heads-of-State (1842–1844; 1846–1847) 
From 1842 to 1844 and from 1846 to 1847 the country returned to the system of Vice-Heads-of-State.

Vice-Presidents of State (1847–1848) 
From 1847 to 1848 Costa Rica had a Vice-President of State, who was popularly elected.

Vice-Presidents of the Republic of Costa Rica (1848–1859) 
From 1848 to 1849 the popularly elected Costa Rican Vice-President of the Republic presided over the Legislature.

Designates to the Presidency 1859–1881 
In the Costa Rican constitutions of 1859, 1869 and 1871, the role of popularly elected vice-president was replaced by two Designates to the Presidency, elected annually by the Legislature.

Designates to the Presidency 1881–1882 
In 1881 President Tomás Guardia Gutiérrez replaced the system of two Designates to the Presidency with one of seven Designates. This situation lasted until the constitutional government assumed power in 1882

Designates to the Presidency 1882–1948 

In 1882, with the restoration of the 1871 Constitution, Costa Rica returned to the system of Designates to the Presidency, but with three designates, elected by the Legislature for same four-year period as the President of the Republic.

Vice Presidents of Costa Rica (since 1949) 

In accordance with the Costa Rican constitution of 7 November 1949 there are two vice presidents, popularly elected at the same time as the president.

See also
 List of current vice presidents

Notes
1.Casas Zamora resigned following a political scandal, while Chinchilla resigned the next year in order to pursue presidency.

References

External links
Designates from 1824 to 1940

Government of Costa Rica
Costa Rica
 
1949 establishments in Costa Rica